A bail bondsman, bail bond agent or bond dealer is any person, agency or corporation that will act as a surety and pledge money or property as bail for the appearance of a defendant in court.

Bail bond agents are almost exclusively found in the United States, as the practice of bail bonding is illegal in most other countries. The industry is represented by various trade associations, with the Professional Bail Agents of the United States and the American Bail Coalition forming an umbrella group for bail agents and surety companies and the National Association of Fugitive Recovery Agents representing the bounty hunting industry. Organizations that represent the legal profession, including the American Bar Association and the National District Attorneys Association, oppose the practice of bond dealing, claiming that it discriminates against poor and middle-class defendants while doing nothing for public safety.

History 
The first modern bail bonds business in the United States was established by Peter P. McDonough in San Francisco in 1898. However, clay tablets from ca. 2750 BC describe surety bail bond agreements made in the Akkadian city of Eshnunna, located in modern-day Iraq.

Modern practice
According to 1996 figures for the U.S., one quarter of all released felony defendants fail to appear at trial, but those released via bail bond appear more frequently than other defendants.

Laws governing the practice of bail bonds vary by state, although the Uniform Criminal Extradition Act, sponsored by the Uniform Law Commission, has been widely adopted. In the state of California, bail bond agreements must be verified and certified by the California Department of Insurance. The practice of commercial bail bonds is unlawful in the states of Illinois, Kentucky, Oregon, and Wisconsin.

Applicable federal laws include the Excessive Bail Clause of the Eighth Amendment and the Bail Reform Act of 1984, incorporated into the Comprehensive Crime Control Act of 1984.

Training and requirements
"There are 18 states where theoretically anyone can become a bail recovery agent..." In most jurisdictions, bond agents must be licensed to carry on business within the state. Some insurance companies may offer insurance coverage that includes local bail bonds for traffic related arrests.

Pricing 
Bond agents generally charge a fee of ten percent for a state charge and fifteen percent for a federal bail bond, with a minimum of one hundred dollars in such states as Florida, required in order to post a bond for the full amount of the bond. This fee is not refundable and represents the bond agent's compensation for services rendered.

Nevada is one of the states which allow an arrestee to "put up" a residence for a bail bond. To do this, the applicant must register a deed of trust and name the bonding agency as beneficiary. While this gives the bail company a lien on the property, it can only take ownership if the defendant fails to comply with all court instructions and rules.

In some states, such as Florida, bondsmen are responsible for paying the forfeitures, and if they fail to pay the full amount, they are forbidden to write further bonds in the state.

Recovery and bounty hunting 
If the defendant fails to appear in court, the bond agent is allowed by law or contractual arrangement to bring the defendant to the jurisdiction of the court in order to recover the money paid out under the bond, usually through the use of a bounty hunter. "Only the Philippines has a surety bail system similar in structure and function [as the US]." In the past, courts in Australia, India and South Africa had disciplined lawyers for professional misconduct for setting up commercial bail arrangements.

Some states, such as North Carolina, have outlawed the use or licensing of "bounty hunters"; therefore, bail bondsmen must apprehend their own fugitives. Bond agents are allowed to sue indemnitors, any persons who guaranteed the defendants' appearances in court or the defendants themselves for any moneys forfeited to the court for failure of defendants appear.

Regulation 
 four states—Illinois, Kentucky, Oregon, and Wisconsin—had completely banned commercial bail bonding, usually substituting the 10% cash deposit alternative described below. Some of these states specifically allow AAA and similar organizations to continue providing bail bond services pursuant to insurance contracts or membership agreements. While not outright illegal, the practice of bail bond services has effectively ended in Massachusetts as of 2014. Most of the US legal establishment, including the American Bar Association and the National District Attorneys Association, dislikes the bail bond business, saying it discriminates against poor and middle-class defendants, does nothing for public safety, and usurps decisions that ought to be made by the justice system. Charitable bail funds have sprung up to combat the issue of discrimination, using donations to cover the bail amount for the arrested person. The economically discriminatory effect of the bond system has been controversial and subject to attempts at reform since the 1910s. The market evidence indicates that judges in setting bail demanded lower probabilities of flight from minority defendants— see, for example, Frank Murphy's institution of a bond department at Detroit, Michigan's Recorder's Court. Furthermore, the economic incentives of bonding for profit make it less likely that defendants charged with minor crimes (who are assigned lower amounts of bail) will be released. This is because a bail bondsman will not find it profitable to work on matters where the percentage of profit would yield $10 or $20. As such, bail bondsmen help release people with higher amounts of bail who are also charged with higher crimes, creating an imbalance in the numbers of people charged with minor crimes (low level misdemeanors) and increasing jail expenditures for this category of crimes.

California 
In California, bail is heavily regulated by the California Penal Code, California Insurance Code and California Code of Regulations. All violations of the aforementioned constitute felony violations via California Insurance Code 1814— including administrative regulatory codes such as record keeping, how solicitations are conducted, collateral and treatment of arrestees. Under California law it is a crime for a bail bondsman to solicit business at a county jail.

Criticism 
Several high-profile cases involving bondsman misconduct have led to calls for increased regulation of the industry or outright abolition of the bail for profit industry. One of the most prominent cases, in Louisiana, involved bribery of judges by a bail bonding agency. A far-reaching FBI investigation code-named "Operation Wrinkled Robe" led to criminal charges and removal proceedings for various judges, such as Ronald Bodenheimer, and police officers.

The American Civil Liberties Union has criticized the practice of bail bonds as a form of injustice against low-income communities and fueling mass incarceration of innocent people, with the ACLU recommending automated text messages or robocalls for court appearances.

Alternatives 
In addition to the use of bail bonds, a defendant may be released under other terms. These alternatives include pretrial services programs, own recognizance or signature bond, cash bond, surety bond, property bond, and citation release. The choice of these alternatives is determined by the court.

See also 
Bail fund
Bail
Surety
Surety bond

References

Further reading
F. E. Devine, Commercial Bail Bonding: A Comparison of Common Law Alternatives (New York: Praeger, 1991) .

External links 

Bail Burden Keeps U.S. Jails Stuffed with Inmates. NPR, 2010/01/21

Legal professions
Sureties
Bondsman
Security companies